Miguel Ángel Diloné Reyes (born November 1, 1954) is a former Major League Baseball switch hitting outfielder. He played 12 seasons with the Pittsburgh Pirates, Oakland Athletics, Chicago Cubs, Cleveland Indians, Chicago White Sox, Montreal Expos and San Diego Padres.

Diloné represented the Dominican Republic at the 1971 Pan American Games.

Diloné began his career as a September call-up in 1974 at the age of 19. Used primarily as a pinch runner with the Pirates, he had 21 stolen bases in four seasons with the Pirates. In 1978 he was traded to the A's along with Elias Sosa and Mike Edwards for Manny Sanguillen.  He stole 56 bases during his 2 years in Oakland.  After splitting his 1979 season between the Oakland Athletics and Chicago Cubs, Miguel landed in with the Cleveland Indians in 1980 where he had the best years of his career.  1980 was his career season. Batting .341, he had 180 hits, 30 doubles, 9 triples and 61 stolen bases. During his 4 years with the Indians, he stole 128 bases, hitting .289.  Toward the end of the 1983 season, the Indians traded him to the Chicago White Sox for Rich Barnes, who 7 days later traded him back to the Pittsburgh Pirates for Randy Niemann. After finishing the 1983 season with the Pirates, Miguel signed with the Montreal Expos as a free agent.  Miguel played the 1984 season and part of 1985 with the Expos before being released and signing with the San Diego Padres to finish up the 1985 season and his major league career.

Diloné finished his career with 267 stolen bases, getting caught stealing 78 times, with a batting average of .265 and a OPS of .648.  In exactly 2,000 career at bats, Miguel had 530 hits, 67 doubles, 25 triples, 6 HRs and 129 RBIs.  He finished in the top 10 in stolen bases 4 times during his career.

In 2009, Diloné lost an eye when a baseball struck him in the face. At the time he was coaching his son and a 15-year-old prospect.

See also
 List of Major League Baseball career stolen bases leaders

References

External links

1954 births
Águilas Cibaeñas players
Baseball players at the 1971 Pan American Games
Charleston Charlies players
Charleston Pirates players
Chicago Cubs players
Chicago White Sox players
Cleveland Indians players
Columbus Clippers players
Dominican Republic disabled sportspeople
Dominican Republic expatriate baseball players in Canada
Dominican Republic expatriate baseball players in the United States
Las Vegas Stars (baseball) players
Living people
Major League Baseball center fielders
Major League Baseball left fielders
Major League Baseball players from the Dominican Republic
Montreal Expos players
Niagara Falls Pirates players
Oakland Athletics players
Ogden A's players
Pan American Games competitors for the Dominican Republic
Pittsburgh Pirates players
Salem Pirates players
San Diego Padres players
Wichita Aeros players